TTS Trenčín was a Slovak football club, playing in the town of Trenčín.

History
The club was founded in 1904 as Trencsény Torna Egyesület (TTE).

TTS Trenčín first played in the top flight of Slovakia during World War II, when Slovak and Czech competitions were separated. During the sixties the team returned to the top flight, under new name Jednota Trenčín. The best place was in 1963 when the club became second after Dukla Prague. In 1966 and 1968 the team participated in the Mitropa Cup. In 1972 the club was relegated.

After three seasons Jednota returned and played in the top flight until 1980. After this the team could never return and was even relegated to the third level in 1981. However Jednota was promoted immediately and changed the name back to TTS. In 1985 TTS was relegated to the third level and did not manage to come back. During the last Czechoslovak season in 1992/93 the team ended one place above newly founded Ozeta Dukla Trenčin. Afterwards both clubs merged.

Honours

Domestic
 Czechoslovak First League
  Runners-up (1): 1962–63
  Third Place (1): 1967–68
 Slovak Cup
  Winners (1): 1978

European
 Mitropa Cup
  Runners-up (1): 1966

Notable players
Had international caps for their respective countries. Players whose name is listed in bold represented their countries while playing for TTS.
	

	 	
 Milan Albrecht	
 Pavol Bencz	
 Ivan Bilský
 Ladislav Józsa
	 	
 Ján Kapko
  Bozhin Laskov
 Vojtech Masný
 Emil Pažický
	 	
 Miroslav Siva
 Anton Švajlen

References

Defunct football clubs in Slovakia
Czechoslovak First League clubs
Trenčín
1904 establishments in Slovakia
Association football clubs established in 1904
Association football clubs disestablished in 1993
1993 disestablishments in Slovakia
Sport in Trenčín Region